Thanos is a Marvel Comics supervillain.

Thanos may also refer to:

 Thanos (Marvel Cinematic Universe), the Marvel Cinematic Universe version of the character 
 Thanos (name), a list of people with the given name and surname
 Thanos simonattoi, a Brazilian carnivorous dinosaur active during the Cretaceous Period

See also
 Thanatos, Greek personification of death